The Mustafa Prize is a science and technology award, granted to top researchers and scientists from the Organisation of Islamic Cooperation (OIC) member states. The prize is granted to scholars of the Islamic world as one of the symbols of scientific excellence in recognition of the outstanding scientists and pioneers of scientific and technological cooperation and development in the world. The science and technology $500,000 prize, Medal, and Diploma are awarded to Muslim researchers and scientists, regardless of whether they live in Muslim-majority nations or elsewhere, as well as non-Muslim scientists in Muslim countries. In 2016, science journal called the prize, the Muslim Nobel.

The Mustafa Prize is held biennially during the Islamic Unity week in Iran.
The prize is awarded in the four categories of "Information and Communication Science and Technology," "Life and Medical Science and Technology," "Nanoscience and Nanotechnology," and "All Areas of Science and Technology". These areas include the following UNESCO fields of education: natural sciences, mathematics, and statistics; information and communication technologies; engineering, manufacturing, and construction; agriculture, forestry, fisheries and veterinary; health and welfare as well as cognitive science and Islamic economics and banking.

History, governance, and nominations
The Mustafa Prize is biennially given by Iran's government to leading researchers and scientists from countries of the Organization of Islamic Cooperation. 
The inaugural prize was given in 2016.

The Mustafa Science and Technology Foundation has formed several committees to organize the Mustafa Prize. The Mustafa Prize Policy-Making Council was established in 2013. Its secretary said in 2017 that the prize and its governing bodies had no formal political relations with any country. The MSTF Advisory Board is composed of volunteer high-rank academics, public sector officials, technologists, and business leaders from the Islamic community who will advise and recommend the MSTF at a strategic level and help it in achieving its objectives through promoting public awareness, fundraising, and networking. Other communities created to achieve the goals of Mustafa Foundation are Safir Al-Mustafa Club, Mustafa Prize Volunteers Community, The Mustafa Art Museum, the MSTF Laboratory Network, and the MSTF innovation labs. Nature interpreted the establishment of the prize as growing importance of domestic science in Iran and the nurturing of scientific cooperation and exchange with other nations.

For the first Information and Communication Science and Technology, Life and Medical Science and Technology, and Nanoscience and Nanotechnology, the nominees should be citizens of one of the 57 Islamic countries with no restrictions on religion, gender and/or age. However, for the category "All Areas of Science and Technology," only Muslims may be nominated with no restrictions on citizenship, gender and/or age. Nominations maybe made by scientific centers and universities, science and technology associations and centers of excellence, academies of science of Islamic countries, and science and technology parks,

Laureates

See also
 List of general science and technology awards

References

External links 

Academic awards
Awards established in 2013
International awards
Science and technology in Iran
Organisation of Islamic Cooperation
Islamic awards